DMPE may refer to the chemicals:

1,2-Bis(dimethylphosphino)ethane.
Dimyristoylphosphatidylethanolamine.